The Idaho & Washington Northern Railroad was a shortline railroad that operated between McGuire's Idaho and Metaline Falls, WA. It was later purchased by the Milwaukee Road

History 
The I&WN was created in 1907 by Frederick Blackwell, to reach timberland. 

Construction started in early 1907 and the line from McGuire's to Newport was completed in late 1907. The line from Newport to Metaline Falls was completed in 1911.

The railroad was short lived as it quickly began losing money due to the recession. In 1916 Blackwell relinquished control of the railroad to the Milwaukee Road as they agreed to take all debts owed by the I&WN. 

The line became the MILWs Metaline Falls Branch after it was acquired.

Route 
The Idaho and Washington Northern Railroads southern end was in McGuire's, ID where it connected to other railroads. At the Jct it ran northward through the communities of Rathdrum, Spirit Lake, Coleman, Blanchard, Newport , Dalkenna, Usk, Ione and Metaline Falls.

Most of the I&WN line is still visible or in use. 

The McGuire-Newport segment was abandoned In the late 1970s and is privately owned by various people. 

The Newport to Usk segment is currently owned and used by POVA. 

The Usk-Metaline Falls segment was abandoned by POVA in 2016 due to no customers.

Roster 
The Idaho and Washington Northern Railroad had several steam locomotives.  

I&WN 5: Lima 3 truck Shay, Class C (later MILW 26)   

I&WN 6: Lima 3 truck Shay, class C (sold to MILW but never rostered or used)    

I&WN 11: Baldwin 4-6-0 (later MILW 2713)

I&WN 12: Baldwin 4-6-0 (later MILW 2714)

I&WN 15: Baldwin 4-6-0 (later MILW 2715) 

I&WN 16: Baldwin 4-6-0 (later MILW 2716) 

I&WN 17: Baldwin 4-6-0 (later MILW 2717)  

I&WN 21: BLW 2-8-0 (later MILW 7555) 

I&WN 22: BLW 2-8-0 (later MILW 7556) 

I&WN 23: BLW 2-8-0 (later MILW 7557) 

I&WN 24: BLW 2-8-0 (later MILW 7558) 

I&WN 25: BLW 2-8-0 (later MILW 7559) 

I&WN 26: BLW 2-8-0 (later MILW 1347) 

I&WN 31: 4-4-2

References

Sources 

Washington (state) railroads
Idaho railroads
Defunct Idaho railroads